The Pa-O National Army (abbreviated PNA) is a Pa-O insurgent group in Myanmar (Burma). It was established in 1949 and is the armed wing of the Pa-O National Organisation.

The PNA protects the PNO-governed Pa-O Self-Administered Zone, which consists of three townships in southern Shan State: Hopong, Hsi Hseng, and Pinlaung townships.

The PNA signed a ceasefire agreement with the then ruling State Peace and Development Council on 11 April 1991 and reformed itself as a people's militia force. It merged with other Pa-O paramilitary groups on 9 December 2009. Following the military coup d'état on 1 February 2021, there have been reports of PNA forcibly recruiting locals, extorting money and conducting joint operations with the Burmese military against resistance groups. An outpost occupied by allied forces of the Burmese military and PNA in Nyaung Shwe Township, southern Shan State was seized by a joint force of Pekon People's Defence Force and Karenni Nationalities Defence Force in May 2022.

References

Rebel groups in Myanmar
Separatism in Myanmar
Paramilitary organisations based in Myanmar
1949 establishments in Burma